Mark William Balmert (born 1954) is retired United States Navy rear admiral.  His last command was the joint Navy and Marine Corps Expeditionary Strike Group 3.  He retired from the Navy in 2008 and joined Northrop Grumman as a Strategic Senior Consulting Manager.

Biography

Early years; education
Balmert was born in Fort Madison, Iowa.  He participated in the Navy Reserve Officer Training program (NROTC) at the  University of Notre Dame, and graduated in 1977 with a Bachelor of Science degree in chemical engineering.  He earned a Master of Science in financial management from the Naval Postgraduate School  in 1985.  He is a 1989 graduate of the Armed Forces Staff College  He also attended the National Securities Management Course at the Maxwell School of Citizenship at Syracuse University.

United States Navy career
Balmert was commissioned as an Ensign in December 1977 through the NROTC program. He attended Surface Warfare Officers School and then began his first sea assignment in 1978 aboard the USS Lynde McCormick (DDG 8). He served as the Engineering officer aboard the  USS Fife (DD 991) from 1986 to 1988, and aboard the USS Merrill (DD 976) as Executive Officer from 1991 to 1992. CDR Balmert commanded USS Chandler (DDG 996) from 7 August 1996 to 18 December 1998, winning the Battle Efficiency Award, and Destroyer Squadron 7 during Operation Enduring Freedom and Operation Iraqi Freedom as Sea Combat Commander for the Constellation Battle Group.

Shore assignments include Naval Plans Officer at Headquarters, United Nations Command and Combined Forces Command in Seoul, Korea; Surface Commander Assignments Branch Head in Millington, Tenn.; Chief of Staff for Commander Naval Surface Force U.S. Pacific Fleet; Director, Operations Division, Office of Budget in the Office of the Assistant Secretary of the Navy (Financial Management/ Comptroller) and Director, Operations Division, Fiscal Management Division in the Office of the Chief of Naval Operations.

Balmert also served as Chief Staff Officer of Destroyer Squadron 13; Assistant Surface Operations Officer for Commander 7th Fleet; Flag Secretary for Commander 3rd Fleet; Operations Officer for Commander Cruiser-Destroyer Group 1; Commander Expeditionary Strike Group 5; and as Commander Expeditionary Strike Group 3.  He was succeeded as commander for ESG3 on May 22, 2008 by Rear Admiral Kendall L. Card. RDML Balmert's final assignment was as Commander, Amphibious Group Three.

Balmert was nominated for promotion to the rank of rear admiral (lower half) in April 2004.

He retired from the U.S. Navy in 2008.

Military awards and decorations
RDML Balmert's personal decorations include the Legion of Merit with four Gold Stars, the Bronze Star, the Defense Meritorious Service Medal, the Meritorious Service Medal with two Gold Stars, the Navy Commendation Medal with three Gold Stars, and the Joint Service Achievement Medal.

  Legion of Merit with four Gold Stars
  Bronze Star
  Defense Meritorious Service Medal
  Meritorious Service Medal with two Gold Stars
  Navy and Marine Corps Commendation Medal with three Gold Stars
  Joint Service Achievement Medal

Post-military career
In July 2008, Balmert joined Northrop Grumman Corporation as a Strategic Senior Consulting Manager of Northrop Grumman Shipbuilding. Balmert currently serves as the President of the San Diego Military Advisory Council.

References

External links

''This article incorporates text in the public domain from the United States Navy.

1954 births
Living people
People from Fort Madison, Iowa
Notre Dame College of Engineering alumni
Naval Postgraduate School alumni
Recipients of the Legion of Merit
United States Navy rear admirals (lower half)
Military personnel from Iowa